This list of deepest caves includes the deepest known natural caves according to maximum surveyed depth . The depth value is measured from the highest to the lowest accessible cave point.

See also
List of caves
List of deepest mines
 List of longest caves
List of sinkholes
 Show cave
 Speleology

External links
 World's Deepest Caves
 World's Longest Caves

References

Deepest Caves
Caves
Vertical position